The Again River is a tributary of the Harricana River flowing to Canada in:
the Cochrane District in Ontario; and
the municipality of Eeyou Istchee Baie-James, in the administrative region of Nord-du-Québec, in Quebec.

The surface of the river is usually frozen from early November to mid-May, but safe circulation on the ice generally occurs generally from mid-November to the end of April.

Geography 
The main hydrographic slopes adjacent to the Again River are:
North side: Harricana River;
Eastern side: Harricana River, Mannerelle River, Malouin River, Breynat River, Despreux River;
South side: Turgeon River, Detour River;
West side: Lawagamau River (Ontario), Corner River (Ontario), Seal River (Ontario).

The Again River originates at the mouth of Lake Mine (length: ,) in the eastern part of the Cochrane District.

The source of the Again River is located at:
 at the east of the Ontario border;
 at the south of the mouth of the Again River;
 east of Kesagami Lake (Ontario);
 at the south of the mouth of the Harricana River, in Ontario.

 to the north through three lakes, northeasterly through two lakes including Lake Favell (Ontario) and eastward up to a branch line (from the south- East) which drains the cross-border area between Quebec and Ontario;
 to the boundary between Quebec and Ontario;
 to the north in Quebec more or less along the interprovincial boundary and in a marsh area, until the cut between the boundary between Quebec and Ontario;
 to the north-west in the Cochrane District in Ontario in the marsh area to the mouth.

The Again River flows into the southwestern shore of the Harricana River in front of Low Shoal Island. This confluence is located at:
 at southeast of the mouth of the Harricana River;
 at west of the boundary between Quebec and Ontario;
 at south of the center of the village of Moosonee in Ontario.

Toponymy 
The hydronyme "rivière Again" was formalized on December 5, 1968, by the Commission de toponymie du Québec, at the creation of this commission.

See also 
Cochrane District, an administrative region of Ontario
Eeyou Istchee Baie-James (municipality), a municipality
Jamésie, a region of Northwestern Quebec
Harricana River, a watercourse
James Bay, a body of water
List of rivers of Quebec
List of rivers in Ontario

References

External links 

Rivers of Nord-du-Québec
Rivers of Cochrane District